Cecil Township is a civil township in Bottineau County in the U.S. state of North Dakota. As of the 2000 census, its population was 28.

Geography
Cecil Township is located in survey township 160N, Range 74W.

Streams
Miller Creek
Willow Creek

History
Cecil Township was organized in 1910 from Lincoln School Township.

The Soo Line Railroad was a major transportation route in the township. Overly, North Dakota in the eastern part of the township was a railroad hub, including a roundhouse for servicing locomotives. Overly also served as a way station for rail crews traveling east and west.

It was reportedly named after the town of Tasco in Sheridan County, Kansas. Grain elevators were constructed and operated at the site, but the area saw little development.

The settlers originally moved to the area from Wild Rice, then a French settlement near Fargo. Settlers built a church they called the "Mission of St. Genevieve," which was moved to Overly in 1921.

Schools
Cote School No 2
Lincoln School No. 2 (Abandoned)

Cities and populated places
Overly

References

Townships in Bottineau County, North Dakota
Populated places established in 1910
Townships in North Dakota